Vida Ognjenović (born 14 August 1941) is a Serbian theater director, playwright, writer, drama professor and diplomat.

Biography
Ognjenović completed primary education in the town of Vrbas, before going to Sremski Karlovci for gymnasium studies and later got degrees in world literature at University of Belgrade Faculty of Philology and directing at The Faculty of Dramatic Arts.

In 1989, she was one of the founders of the Democratic Party, the first opposition party in Serbia. She was appointed Ambassador to Norway representing Serbia and Montenegro from 2001 until 2006. She served as the ambassador of Serbia to Denmark from 2007 until 2013.

Her drama "Jegor's road" was inspired by the story about Russian monk from Praskvica Monastery.

She was one of the leading Parliamentary candidates of the Democratic Party in the January 2007 elections in Serbia. She was a vice-president of the Democratic Party.

Awards
In 2012, she was given the World Award of Humanism by the Ohrid Academy of Humanism.

Works
 Šekspiromanija (1980),
 Strah od scenske rasprave (1980),
 Melanholične drame (1991), 
 Kanjoš Macedonović (1993), 
 Devojka modre kose (1993), 
 Setne komedije (1994),
 Otrovno mleko maslačka (1994),
 Kuća mrtvih mirisa (1995),
 Stari sat (1996),
 Mileva Ajnštajn (1999), 
 Jegorov put (2000),
 Najlepše pripovetke (2001),
 Drame I-III (2001–2002), 
 Putovanje u putopis (2006),
 Preljubnici (2006),
 Don Krsto (2007),
 Nasuprot proročanstvu (2007),
 Prava adresa (2007),
 Nema više naivnih pitanja (2008),
 Posmatrač ptica (2010), 
 Živi primeri (2012)

External links
  Short biography in English

References

1941 births
Living people
Writers from Nikšić
Democratic Party (Serbia) politicians
Serbian dramatists and playwrights
Serbian humanities academics
Serbian writers
Serbian opera librettists
Serbian women writers
Ambassadors of Serbia and Montenegro to Norway
Ambassadors of Serbia to Denmark
Yugoslav dissidents
Women dramatists and playwrights
Women librettists
Serbian women diplomats
Serbian women ambassadors
Politicians from Nikšić
Diplomats from Nikšić